Sir Adrian Vivian Sinton Hill,  (born 9 October 1958) is an Irish-British vaccinologist, Director of the Jenner Institute and Lakshmi Mittal and Family Professor of Vaccinology at the University of Oxford, an honorary Consultant Physician in Infectious Diseases, and Fellow of Magdalen College, Oxford. Hill is a leader in the field of  malaria vaccine development  and was a co-leader of the research team which produced the Oxford–AstraZeneca COVID-19 vaccine, along with Professor Sarah Gilbert of the Jenner Institute and Professor Andrew Pollard of the Oxford Vaccine Group.

Early life and education 
Hill was educated at Belvedere College in Dublin. He began reading medicine at Trinity College Dublin, where he was elected a Foundation Scholar in 1978. Thereupon he transferred to Magdalen College, Oxford for one year, but he ended up remaining in Oxford to complete the rest of his medical degree, qualifying in 1982.

Career and research 
During his time at the Wellcome Trust Centre for Human Genetics his research group studied genetic susceptibility to infections such as malaria, tuberculosis, and HIV. From 1997  he has developed candidate vaccines for malaria which produce cellular (T-cell) immunity and partial efficacy using Adenovirus and Modified vaccinia Ankara (MVA) viral vector vaccines in a prime-boost regime. From 2005 he has played a leading role in the pre-clinical and clinical assessment of new chimpanzee adenoviral vaccine vectors, particularly ChAd63, ChAd3 and ChAdOx1. 
His group has developed numerous candidate vaccines against malaria which have been tested in clinical trials in the UK and Africa. In 2021 his group reported high efficacy of a new R21/matrix-M candidate vaccine in Burkina Faso children and this vaccine is now in a phase III licensure trial. In 2014, he led a clinical trial of an Ebola vaccine based on chimpanzee adenoviral and MVA vector technology in response to the West African Ebola virus epidemic. In 2016 he co-founded Vaccitech plc, an Oxford University spin-off company developing therapeutic and preventive vaccines based on viral vector technology. In 2017 he led a successful major award application to Innovate UK to co-found the Vaccines Manufacturing and Innovation Centre (VMIC) in Harwell, Oxfordshire, one of the first purpose-built vaccine manufacturing centres for emergency response vaccines. In response to the 2020 COVID-19 pandemic he worked with many others at Oxford to develop and partner the ChAdOx1 vector-based SARS-CoV-2 vaccine, notably with AstraZeneca and the Serum Institute of India, supporting large scale access for low and middle income countries.

Honours and awards 
 1999 Elected a Fellow of the Royal College of Physicians (FRCP)
 1999 Elected a Fellow of the Academy of Medical Sciences (FMedSci)
 2005 Appointed to a Fellowship by Special Election at Magdalen College, Oxford
 2005 Founded the Jenner Institute at Oxford University and appointed institute Director
 2008 Elected an Honorary Fellow of Trinity College Dublin (Hon. FTCD)
 2020 Appointed to an ad hominen Lakshmi Mittal and Family Professorship of Vaccinology at Oxford University
 2021 Elected a Fellow of the Royal Society
 2021 Appointed an Honorary Knight Commander of the Order of the British Empire (KBE) in the 2021 Birthday Honours. Made substantive in 2023.

Personal life 
Hill has two children with his former wife, the epidemiologist Sunetra Gupta. In 2021 he married Sabina Murray.

References

20th-century British medical doctors
21st-century British medical doctors
1958 births
Living people
People educated at Belvedere College
Scholars of Trinity College Dublin
Alumni of Magdalen College, Oxford
Academics of the University of Oxford
Fellows of the Academy of Medical Sciences (United Kingdom)
Fellows of the Royal Society
Knights Commander of the Order of the British Empire
Place of birth missing (living people)
NIHR Senior Investigators
Vaccinologists